Twilight's Ransom is a 1988 video game published by Paragon Software.

Gameplay
Twilight's Ransom is a game in which the player has twelve hours to rescue a kidnapped woman in Liberty City.

Reception
Dennis Owens reviewed the game for Computer Gaming World, and stated that "As long as one recognizes that Twilight's Ransom is actually more of a serious text game than a graphic presentation, one should consider purchasing it. It certainly has the capacity to keep you entertained."

References

External links
Review in Compute!
Review in ANALOG Computing
Review in Guida Videogiochi (Italian)
Review in The Games Machine
Review in Amiga User International
Review in Aktueller Software Markt

1988 video games
Adventure games
Amiga games
Apple II games
Atari ST games
Classic Mac OS games
Commodore 64 games
DOS games
Video games about crime
Video games developed in the United States
Video games set in the United States